Allan Dudley Cruickshank (August 29, 1907October 11, 1974) was an American ornithologist and writer. He wrote many books about birds and was the National Audubon Society's official photographer and a staff member for 37 years.

Cruickshank was born in St. Thomas, the Virgin Islands (then under Danish control) on August 29, 1907 but grew up in New York where he began to take part in Christmas Bird Counts from 1922 as part of a group at the Evander Childs High School. He later became a bird educator for the National Audubon, lecturing across the country with slides and films. It has been estimated that his audience may have numbered 2,900,000 people in all. He travelled around the country with his wife Helen taking photographs and also led bird tours in Africa, South America, and Europe. He served as a president of the Linnean Society of New York, received the John Burroughs Medal in 1949 and the Arthur A. Allen Award of Cornell University.

He died from kidney failure in Gainesville, Florida, on October 11, 1974.

Books 
Cruickshank wrote:
Birds Around New York City
Wings in the Wilderness
Hunting With the Camera
Cruickshank's Pocket Guide to Birds
1001 Questions about Birds
Summer Birds of Lincoln County, Maine

References

American ornithologists
1907 births
1974 deaths
People from St. Thomas, Ontario
Nature photographers
20th-century American zoologists